Pierre Amédée Marcel-Béronneau (1869–1937) was a French Symbolist painter. He first worked at the École des Beaux-Arts de Bordeaux at the same time as Fernand Sabatté then became "one of the most brilliant students" of Gustave Moreau at the École nationale supérieure des Beaux-Arts. He was a member of the Société des Artistes Français.

In early February 1909, Kahlil Gibran had been working for a few weeks in Béronneau's studio in Paris; he used "his sympathy towards Béronneau as an excuse to leave the Académie Julian altogether". According to Robin Waterfield, "Gibran was confirmed in his aspiration to be a Symbolist painter" after working in Marcel-Béronneau's studio.

References

External links
 Paintings on rmn.fr
 Musée d'Orsay

1869 births
1937 deaths
20th-century French painters
Symbolist painters
19th-century French painters
Artists from Bordeaux